The Pioneer Valley Transit Authority (PVTA) oversees and coordinates public transportation in the Pioneer Valley of Western Massachusetts. Currently the PVTA offers fixed-route bus service as well as paratransit service for the elderly and disabled. The PVTA was created by Chapter 161B of the Massachusetts General Laws in 1974. It is based in Springfield, Massachusetts, serves Hampden and Hampshire counties, and provides connecting service to the FRTA in Franklin County. It is the largest regional transit authority, and second largest public transit system in Massachusetts after the Massachusetts Bay Transit Authority, providing service to over 11 million riders annually across 24 municipalities in the region, with about 70% of all riders using the system as their primary mode of transit.

Organizational structure

As per Section 25, Chapter 161B of the Massachusetts General Laws, regional transit authorities in Massachusetts are not permitted to directly operate their service, but must instead contract with other entities to operate the buses. As such, the PVTA contracts with two entities to provide fixed-route service in the service area: First Transit and UMass Transit Services. The contractors run semi-autonomous garages that act as vehicle depots for the surrounding areas.

Springfield Area Transit Company
The Springfield Area Transit Company (SATCo) operates the southern portion of PVTA's service area, servicing Hampden County. SATCo, located at 665 Cottage Street in Springfield, is managed by First Transit. All SATCo fixed-route buses are numbered in the 1000 series. SATCo transports more than 9 million passengers annually.

Fleet (Fixed Route Vehicles)

UMass Transit Services

UMass Transit Services operates PVTA's routes through the Five Colleges area in eastern Hampshire County and neighboring towns, with most of the routes centered around UMass Amherst, the largest ridership generator in the service area. UMass Transit Services is a department within the University of Massachusetts Amherst. The UMass Transit garage is located on-campus at 255 Governors Drive, Amherst. All UMass Transit fixed-route buses are numbered in the 3000 series. UMass Transit is a student-based organization with more than 90% of the employees (i.e. bus drivers, mechanics, dispatchers) being UMass students, with the remaining employees falling under University 03 employment status or full time administrators. UMass Transit Services is one of the oldest student driver groups in the country, having been founded in 1969 as a demonstration grant from the Urban Mass Transit Administration. UMass Transit Services operates 10 routes with a fleet of 40 transit vehicles (35' - 60'). Service runs 12 months a year, 20 hours per day, seven days per week. UMass Transit Services transports more than 3.5 million passengers annually.

Fleet (Fixed Route Vehicles)

Valley Area Transit Company
The Valley Area Transit Company (VATCo) operates the central portion of PVTA's service area. All of its routes originate from Northampton, providing connections to the UMass Transit service area via Route 9, and to the SATCo service area on the other side of the Mount Tom Range via Routes 5 and 10. VATCo, located at 54 Industrial Drive in Northampton, is managed by First Transit. All VATCo fixed-route buses are numbered in the 7000 series.

Fleet (Fixed Route Vehicles)

National Express Transit (Paratransit Service) 
ADA Paratransit Service is provided by National Express Transit (NEXT) for the entire service area, except for the University of Massachusetts, where the UMass Special Transportation Service (operated by UMass Transit Services) provides service for University members. Amherst-area paratransit passengers who are not members of the University community are served by NEXT. All paratransit vehicles are numbered in the 5000 series.

Hulmes Transportation Services (Community Shuttles)
The fixed-route van shuttles (Ware-Palmer Circulator, Ware-Palmer Express, and Nashawannuck-Easthampton Express) are operated by Hulmes Transportation Services. These routes are operated by vans numbered in the 1200 series.

Routes

Hampden County
These routes are operated by the Springfield Area Transit Company (SATCo), except for the Ware-Palmer Circulator and Ware-Palmer Express, which are operated by Hulmes Transportation Services.

Amherst/UMass 
These routes are operated by UMass Transit Services (UMTS). See UMass Transit fixed routes for more information.

Northampton
These routes are operated by the Valley Area Transit Company (VATCo), except for the Nashawannuck Express, which is operated by Hulmes Transportation Services.

Connections
PVTA offers connections to the following transit agencies:
Franklin Regional Transit Authority (FRTA), for service to Greenfield, in Franklin County: 
PVTA Route 31 connects with FRTA Route 23 at Sugarloaf Estates in Sunderland.
PVTA Northampton-area routes connect with FRTA Route 31 at the Academy of Music Theater in Northampton.
PVTA Route 46 connects with FRTA Route 31 at the Whately Park and Ride.
CTtransit, for service to Enfield, Windsor Locks, Windsor, and Hartford, CT: 
PVTA Route G5 connects with CTtransit Route 905 (Enfield-Windsor Locks Express) at MassMutual - Bright Meadow Campus, Enfield, CT.
CTrail, for service to Windsor Locks, Windsor, Hartford and New Haven, CT, and points in between:
All PVTA Springfield-area routes except for B23, R24, X90, and WP connect with Hartford Line at Springfield Union Station.
Amtrak, for service to Boston, Albany, Chicago, and points in between, as well as Greenfield, Hartford, New Haven, New York, and Washington, D.C.:
All PVTA Springfield-area routes except for B23, R24, X90, and WP connect with Lake Shore Limited, Northeast Regional, Hartford Line, Valley Flyer, and Vermonter at Springfield Union Station.
Massachusetts Bay Transportation Authority (MBTA), for service to Boston:
PVTA Route B79 connects with Framingham/Worcester Line at Worcester Union Station. 
Worcester Regional Transit Authority (WRTA), for service in and around Greater Worcester:
PVTA Route B79 connects with all WRTA routes at Worcester Union Station.

Fares

One-way
One-way fixed-route fares are noted below.

NOTE: Buses operated by UMass Transit Services (3000-series) do not have fareboxes (see UMass Transit buses below).

One-way fares for adults 13 and older are $1.40 if purchased at the PVTA Customer Service Center at Springfield Union Station. Transfers for children 6-12 are $0.25, and transfers for mobility impaired passengers and seniors are $0.10.

Passes
All passes are good through the end of the service day.
1-Day passes are sold on PVTA Springfield and Northampton buses at the fareboxes, as well as at ticket vending machines at Springfield Union Station, Holyoke Transportation Center, and Westfield Olver Transit Pavilion. 
7- and 31-day passes are sold at Big Y supermarkets in the service area, at Springfield Union Station (at the PVTA Customer Service Center as well as the ticket vending machines), at the Holyoke Transportation Center (at the customer service center as well as the ticket vending machine), at the Westfield Olver Transit Pavilion (ticket vending machines only), and by the Western New England University's bursar office. 
The 31-day pass is also sold on the PVTA website.
Riders should not rely on PVTA ticket vending machines at Union Station, Holyoke Transportation Center, and Westfield Olver Transit Pavilion as they are out of service as of 2019. Tickets can be purchased with credit/debit cards at Customer Service Centers, open 9am-4:45pm Monday through Friday. Monthly passes can be purchased at Big Y Supermarket Customer Service counters during other hours.
All tickets and passes are available for purchase using the MassDOT BusPlus smartphone app, so riders can purchase their fare without using cash. Riders paying cash must use exact change on board.

Routes operated by UMass Transit Services
PVTA buses operated by UMass Transit do not charge fares. See here for more details.

Ridership increase

Ridership is up 12% in September 2014 and 9% in October.

Accounting errors investigation
An audit in 2005 revealed that the PVTA made approximately $10 million in accounting errors on a transportation development project at Springfield's Union Station. Initial reports said PVTA could owe the federal government as much as $4 million.  That amount was reduced in 2009 to less than $1 million. A federal probe in 2006 also targeted some PVTA employees. Subsequently, Administrator Gary Shepard resigned in 2006 after being put on leave by the Advisory Board, but he was never charged with any offense.

See also
 Holyoke Street Railway, a predecessor of the authority and former contractor, dissolved in 1991
 Springfield Street Railway, a predecessor of the authority, merged into the Springfield Area Transit Company in 1981

References

External links

Bus transportation in Massachusetts
Economy of Springfield, Massachusetts
University of Massachusetts Amherst
Organizations established in 1974